Nienburg is a railway station located in Nienburg, Germany. The station is located on the Bremen–Hanover railway and the Nienburg–Minden railway. The train services are operated by Deutsche Bahn. The station is also served by the Hanover S-Bahn.

Train services
The following services currently call at the station:

Intercity services (IC 56) Norddeich - Emden - Oldenburg - Bremen - Hanover - Braunschweig - Magdeburg - Leipzig / Berlin - Cottbus
Regional services  Norddeich - Emden - Oldenburg - Bremen - Nienburg - Hanover
Regional services  Bremerhaven-Lehe - Bremen - Nienburg - Hanover
Regional services  Porta-Express Nienburg - Minden - Bielefeld
Hannover S-Bahn services  Nienburg - Wunstorf - Hanover - Weetzen - Haste

References

External links

Railway stations in Lower Saxony
Hannover S-Bahn stations
Railway stations in Germany opened in 1847
Nienburg (district)